The University of Ribeirão Preto (UNAERP) is a higher education and technology center in the state of São Paulo. It is private, maintained by student fees, entering this through vestibular and the AERP (Ribeirão Preto Teaching Association). Its two campuses are divided into two cities one in Ribeirão Preto and one in Guaruja.

History 
The University of Ribeirão Preto was the first institution of higher education in the region of Ribeirão Preto. Founded on 1 June 1924 as "Society School Pharmácia and Ribeirão Preto Dental School" by a group of idealistic health professionals, intellectuals and educators. The establishment of the university was intended to promote the social, educational and cultural development of the area.

In the 1920s, Ribeirão Preto presented itself as one of the most prosperous areas in the state of São Paulo. The wealth generated by the production of coffee led to the region attracting migrants from various parts of the country and immigrants from abroad, with high numbers of Italian people moving to the area.

It was against this background in 1928 that the Ribeirão Preto Education Association (AERP) was founded. Today the AERP maintains the UNAERP and has consolidated it into an institution with strong academic tradition.

In 1959, Professor Electro Bonini (1913–2011) took over the administration of the AERP. During this period the university underwent a large expansion and implemented new courses. In 1961, the Faculty of Law, Laudo de Camargo, was established as well as courses in Social Services, Industrial Chemistry and Business Administration. In the 70s, the AERP also offered the Social Communication courses, Physical Education, Chemical Engineering, Fine Arts, Arts Education, Music alongside other degree choices. As the courses offered by the university grew, the university campus itself needed to expand in order to accommodate the wide range of subjects taught. A new campus was opened in 1971 in the Ribeirânia neighborhood of the city. The new campus encompassed an area of 120 thousand square meters. Alongside the expansion of the campus, the university added more courses for study.

In 1985, the university was officially named as the University of Ribeirão Preto. At the same time Professor Elmara Lucia de Oliveira Bonini took over as dean of the university. Following the appointment of Bonini as dean, the university invested in research in the areas of speech therapy, computer engineering, tourism, nursing, and human, social, health, environmental and biotechnology. These investments continued to grow into the following decade and UNAERP again expanded its range of courses, while fostering the research projects and services for the population. In 1999 the campus in Guaruja was established in the coastal city of São Paulo. The campus was opened in June of that year and adhered to the same philosophy of integrating to the social and regional economic demands.

Present day 
Today, the UNAERP is one of the largest educational centers in the state of São Paulo and has undergraduate and postgraduate courses in technology, health, and sciences. UNAERP also conducts 30 extension programs in clinics, laboratories, and in hospitals.

In 2019 UNAERP was ranked in the top 200 universities in Latin America.

References

Universities and colleges in São Paulo (state)
1924 establishments in Brazil
Educational institutions established in 1924
Private universities and colleges in Brazil
Ribeirão Preto